Ryan Kirby (born 6 September 1974) is an English former professional footballer who was last player-manager of Grays Athletic.

Playing career
Kirby, who played as a right back and centre half, began his career with the youth team of Brimsdown Rovers alongside David Beckham, and later played for Arsenal, Doncaster Rovers, Preston North End, Crewe Alexandra, Wigan Athletic, Northampton Town, Stevenage Borough, Aldershot Town and Harlow Town.

He moved from Harlow Town to Thurrock in August 2004. Kirby then returned to Harlow Town, where he was player-manager between November 2006 and December 2008. During 2009 he played for AFC Hornchurch and Boreham Wood. He left Harlow Town in June 2012 to join Grays Athletic.

In his first season at Grays Athletic, they were crowned champions of the Isthmian League Division One North. He later became player-manager, before leaving at the end of the 2013–14 season. Kirby made a total of 74 appearances in all competitions scoring once, over two seasons.

References

1974 births
Living people
English footballers
Brimsdown Rovers F.C. players
Arsenal F.C. players
Doncaster Rovers F.C. players
Preston North End F.C. players
Crewe Alexandra F.C. players
Wigan Athletic F.C. players
Northampton Town F.C. players
Stevenage F.C. players
Aldershot Town F.C. players
Harlow Town F.C. players
Thurrock F.C. players
Hornchurch F.C. players
Boreham Wood F.C. players
Grays Athletic F.C. players
English Football League players
National League (English football) players
Isthmian League players
Association football fullbacks
Association football central defenders
Player-coaches
English football managers
Harlow Town F.C. managers
Grays Athletic F.C. managers